Mélanie Gloria (born June 19, 1987) is a Canadian former professional tennis player.
 
Gloria has won five singles titles and six doubles titles on the ITF Women's Circuit. On 12 September 2005, she reached her best singles ranking of world No. 287. On 29 September 2003, she peaked at No. 578 in the doubles rankings.

In 2004 at the Challenge Bell, she upset the second seed Daniela Hantuchová in the second round. She lost in the quarterfinals to María Emilia Salerni.

Personal life
Gloria is of Portuguese descent. Her parents Helena and Jorge were born in Peniche and some members of her family still live there.

ITF Circuit finals

Singles: 8 (5 titles, 3 runner-ups)

Doubles: 7 (6 titles, 1 runner-up)

References

External links
 
 

1987 births
Canadian female tennis players
Canadian people of Portuguese descent
Living people
Tennis players from Montreal